The Women's team sprint at the 2011 UCI Track Cycling World Championships was held on March 23. 15 nations of 2 cyclists each participated in the contest. After the qualifying, the fastest 2 teams raced for gold, and 3rd and 4th teams raced for bronze.

Results

Qualifying
The Qualifying was held at 19:50.

Finals
The finals were held 20:45.

References

2011 UCI Track Cycling World Championships
UCI Track Cycling World Championships – Women's team sprint